Birds of America (originally titled The Laws of Motion) is a 2008 American comedy-drama independent movie directed by Craig Lucas, written by Elyse Friedman, and starring Matthew Perry. The film premiered at the 2008 Sundance Film Festival on January 24, 2008, It was produced by Plum Pictures.

Premise
All Morrie's wife wants is to start a family. But when Morrie's two siblings show up needing a place to stay will they be able to juggle the pressure, or will it all be too much?

Cast
Matthew Perry as Morrie Tanager, an uptight middle-class man who has to deal with his reckless siblings
Ben Foster as Jay Tanager, Morrie's younger brother who is prone to antisocial experiments
Ginnifer Goodwin as Ida Tanager, Morrie's younger sister who is a "promiscuous, broke, itinerant artist"
Lauren Graham as Betty Tanager, Morrie's wife
Gary Wilmes as Paul, Morrie's and Betty's neighbor as well as a tenured professor at Morrie's school.
Hilary Swank as Laura, Paul's wife
Zoë Kravitz as Gillian Tanager, Jay's wife.
Daniel Eric Gold as Gary, Ida's former boyfriend and Paul's brother.

Production
The film was shot primarily in Darien, Connecticut.

References

External links
 
 

2008 films
2008 comedy-drama films
2008 independent films
American comedy-drama films
American independent films
Films about dysfunctional families
Films directed by Craig Lucas
Films set in Connecticut
Films shot in Connecticut
2000s English-language films
2000s American films